Anser may refer to:

People 
 Anser (poet), poet of ancient Rome
 Anser Farooq, Canadian lawyer

Other uses 
 ANSER, a security and defense analysis group
 Anser (bird), a genus of geese
 Anser (putter), a model of golf club made by Ping
 Anser Island, in Victoria, Australia
 ACME Anser, an amphibious jet fighter project of the 1950s
 Anser, the proper name of the star Alpha Vulpeculae
 Argonne–Northwestern Solar Energy Research Center
 Sega Mega Anser, a Sega Mega Drive accessory

See also 
 Ansar (disambiguation)
 Answer (disambiguation)